Suhas Subramanyam is an American lawyer and member of the Virginia House of Delegates, representing the 87th district. A Democrat, he was elected in 2019 and became the first Indian-American, South Asian, and Hindu to ever be elected to the Virginia General Assembly. He previously served as a White House advisor to President Barack Obama.

Early life and education
Subramanyam was born to Indian immigrants from Bengaluru, India who came to the United States through Dulles Airport in Virginia and eventually settled in Houston, Texas. He attended Clear Lake High School and earned his bachelor's degree in Philosophy from Tulane University.

Career
Subramanyam served as a legislative aide for health care and veterans policy in the House of Representatives after college and also clerked for the U.S Senate Judiciary Committee for Senator Dick Durbin, helping him reintroduce the DREAM Act. He attended Northwestern University Pritzker School of Law, where as a second year law student he helped overturn the wrongful conviction of a man sentenced to life in prison.

In 2015, Subramanyam was appointed to serve as a White House technology policy advisor in the administration of President Barack Obama. He led a task force on technology policy that addressed job creation, IT modernization, and regulating emerging technology.

Virginia House of Delegates

Elections 
2019

In the 2019 Virginia House of Delegates election, Subramanyam ran to succeed Democrat John Bell, who left the seat to run for the 13th district of the Virginia Senate. He faced a crowded primary, running against three other first-generation Americans. He won the primary with 47.0% of the vote.

In the general election, Subramanyam ran on a platform to improve education, healthcare and traffic in the region and across Virginia. Subramanyam went on to win the general election with 62.0% of the vote.

2021

Subramanyam won a second term in the 2021 Virginia House of Delegates election, defeating Republican Gregory Moulthrop by more than double digits.

Policy Positions 
In 2021, Subramanyam co-founded the General Assembly's first Asian American and Pacific Islander Caucus. He is also the co-founder and co-chair of Virginia Commonwealth Caucus, a group of lawmakers seeking to bridge partisan divides.

Electoral history

Personal life 
Suhas lives in Loudoun County, Virginia with his wife Miranda and daughters. An attorney, he serves on the Loudoun Health Council and volunteers as an EMT/firefighter.

See also
List of Indian Americans

References

Living people
21st-century American politicians
Politicians from Houston
1983 births
People from Harris County, Texas
American politicians of Indian descent
American Hindus
Democratic Party members of the Virginia House of Delegates
People from Ashburn, Virginia